Marc Alan Korman (born September 21, 1981) is an American politician from Maryland. He is a member of the Democratic Party who currently serves in the Maryland House of Delegates, representing District 16 in Montgomery County. Since 2023, he has served as the Majority Leader of the Maryland House of Delegates.

Early life and education
Korman was born in Rockville, Maryland on September 21, 1981. He graduated from Richard Montgomery High School in 1999, and entered the University of Southern California at 17 years old, where he earned a B.A. degree in history in 2002; Johns Hopkins University, where he earned an M.A. degree in government with honors in 2007; and the University of Maryland School of Law, where he earned a J.D. degree magna cum laude in 2010.

Career
Korman first got involved with politics at USC, unhappy about the Supreme Court's decision in Bush v. Gore. Following the ruling, Korman joined, and later became president of, the university's Young Democrats Club. He also interned for California governor Gray Davis and worked as a staff assistant at the Kalsman Institute at Hebrew Union College. After graduating from USC, Korman began working as a legislative aide to Congressmen Brad Sherman of California and Brian Baird of Washington.

Korman was admitted to the Maryland Bar in 2010 and the District of Columbia Bar in 2011. Since 2010, he has worked as an associate at the law firm Sidley Austin, practicing in communications and transportation litigation.

Korman declared his candidacy for the Maryland House of Delegates in District 16 on June 10, 2013. Korman won the Democratic primary election, receiving 21.8 percent of the vote, and later won the general election with 22.1 percent of the vote.

In the legislature
Korman was sworn into the Maryland House of Delegates on January 14, 2015. On January 5, 2023, Speaker of the Maryland House of Delegates Adrienne A. Jones named Korman as the House Majority Leader, succeeding Eric Luedtke.

Committee assignments
 Member, Appropriations Committee, 2015–present (education & economic development subcommittee, 2015–2018; oversight committee on personnel, 2015–present, chair, 2019; capital budget subcommittee, 2019–present; chair, transportation & the environment subcommittee, 2019–present)
 Member, Joint Committee on Fair Practices and State Personnel Oversight, 2019–present
 Member, Legislative Policy Committee, 2020–present
 House Chair, Spending Affordability Committee, 2021–present
 Member, Joint Committee on Federal Relations, 2015–2020

Other memberships
 Chair, Montgomery County Delegation, 2019–present (vice-chair, land use, transportation, & public safety committee, 2015–present)
 Member, Maryland Military Installation Legislative Caucus, 2017–present
 Co-Chair, Maryland Legislative Transit Caucus, 2019–present
 Member, Maryland Legislative Latino Caucus, 2019–present

Political positions

Environment
During the 2020 legislative session, Korman introduced legislation that would strengthen the state's plan to make 50 percent of its bus fleet zero-emission by 2030, instead requiring that more than 50 percent of Maryland's fleet be zero-emission by 2030. The bill passed the House of Delegates by a vote of 112-22.

Healthcare
During the 2020 legislative session, Korman introduced legislation that would allow 16- and 17-year-olds to consent to receive vaccines without parental permission.

Taxes
During the 2020 legislative session, Korman introduced legislation that would apply the state's sales tax to digital services. The bill passed, but was vetoed by Governor Hogan on May 7, 2020. The Maryland General Assembly voted to override the gubernatorial veto on February 12, 2021.

Transportation
During his campaign for House of Delegates, Korman proposed a three-point plan for improving Metro services that included increasing funding for operations oversight, improving the aesthetics of stations, and establishing a dedicated funding source for the system. In May 2016, Korman and Erek Barron released a list of Metro reform proposals, including ideas involving dedicated funding, the make-up of the Washington Metropolitan Area Transit Authority board, and vendors in stations to boost revenue. During the 2018 legislative session, Korman introduced legislation that would give the Washington Metro its own dedicated source of funding. The bill passed and was signed into law by Governor Hogan on April 25, 2018.

Korman is regarded as a leading critic of proposals made by Governor Larry Hogan to widen the Capital Beltway, the Baltimore–Washington Parkway, and Interstate 270. During the 2019 legislative session, he introduced legislation that would require the governor's plan to complete an environmental assessment before moving forward. In 2020, Korman introduced legislation that would enshrine a number of pledges made by Maryland Transportation Secretary Greg Slater on public-private partnership projects. The bill passed the House of Delegates by a vote of 97-36. The measure was re-introduced during the 2021 legislative session, during which it again passed the House of Delegates by a vote of 101-35.

During the 2015 legislative session, Korman introduced legislation requiring the State Highway Administration to provide more notice of sidewalk closures when they issue a permit allowing their closure. The bill received an unfavorable report from the Environment and Transportation Committee.

During the 2022 legislative session, Korman introduced legislation that would connect Maryland Area Regional Commuter (MARC) Trains to routes in Alexandria, Virginia and Newark, Delaware.

Personal life
Korman met his future wife, Rebecca, while on a Birthright Israel trip with other Hill staffers in 2004. The couple married in June 2007, and together have two children. Korman is Jewish, and lives in Bethesda, Maryland.

Electoral history

References

1981 births
21st-century American politicians
Democratic Party members of the Maryland House of Delegates
Living people
People associated with Sidley Austin
People from Bethesda, Maryland
People from Rockville, Maryland